Amrit Padraig Singh Bansal-McNulty (born 16 March 2000) is a professional footballer who plays as a midfielder. He has represented Northern Ireland at youth international level.

Club career
Bansal-McNulty joined Queens Park Rangers in August 2014. On 29 November 2019, he joined National League side Torquay United on loan until January. After returning to QPR, he went out on loan again in February, this time joining National League South side Dartford on a one-month deal. The move was later extended for another two months. The following season, he joined Serie C side Como on a season-long loan deal. On 3 October 2020, he made his professional debut, coming on as a substitute for Como in 1–0 win over Pistoiese 1921. In January 2021, he returned to Queens Park Rangers having made three appearances for the Italian side.

On 31 August 2021, he joined EFL League Two club Crawley Town on loan until 3 January 2022. In November 2021, he scored his first goal for the club in a 6-1 win over Lancing in the Sussex Senior Challenge Cup. He returned to Queens Park Rangers at the end of his loan in January 2021, having made 7 appearances for Crawley. On 31 January 2022, Bansal-McNulty rejoined Crawley Town on loan for the remainder of the 2021–22 season, but did not play following his return to Crawley.

International career
On 5 October 2020, Bansal-McNulty received his first international call-up after being included in the Northern Ireland U21 squad for their European qualifiers. The following week, he made his debut, starting in a 2–1 Euro qualifier win over Ukraine U21.

Career statistics

References

2000 births
Living people
Footballers from Greater London
Association football midfielders
Association footballers from Northern Ireland
Queens Park Rangers F.C. players
Torquay United F.C. players
Dartford F.C. players
Como 1907 players
Crawley Town F.C. players
English Football League players
National League (English football) players
Serie C players
English expatriate footballers
Expatriate footballers in Italy
English expatriate sportspeople in Italy
Northern Ireland youth international footballers
English people of Northern Ireland descent